Boso (or Boson) "the Elder" ( 800 – 855) was a Frankish Count of Turin and Count of Valois of the Bosonid dynasty.

Family and issue
He was married to Engeltrude. They had the following issue:

 Boso, Count of Valois (d. 874)
 Teutberga (d. before November 25, 875), married Lothair II
 Richildis (d. 883), married Bivin of Gorze
 Hucbert, Count of Valois, lay abbot of St. Maurice's Abbey (820–864).

Sources
Pierre Riché, The Carolingians, a family who forged Europe.

External links
GENEALOGY.EU: Bosonides
Stirnet: Provence1 

800s births
855 deaths
Year of birth uncertain
Bosonids
Counts of Valois